{{DISPLAYTITLE:C17H19NO3}}
The molecular formula C17H19NO3 may refer to:

 Aposcopolamine
 Chavicine
 Coclaurine
 Hydromorphone
 Morphine
 Norcodeine
 Norhydrocodone
 Piperine

Other uses
A track on the 1994 Fear and Bullets soundtrack album.
A name used by John Bergin, best known for the band Trust Obey, for solo projects
A name for a group of popular influencers online, also known as 9 gang or 'the bois', which include (but not limited too): youtubers, an instagram Meme page owner, a semi-professional Tom Clancy's Rainbow Six Siege esport player and more.

Molecular formulas